It's All Good is the debut album by Suga-T, released on April 16, 1993 through Sick Wid It Records. Production was handled by Studio Ton, with lyrics written by Suga-T and her brother and fellow Click member, E-40.

The album was released prior to Sick Wid Its distribution deal with Jive Records and did not receive much attention outside of the Bay area, however it did spend two weeks on the Billboard Top R&B Albums chart, peaking at number 88 in the week of May 22, 1993.

Track listing
"Rockin' And Clockin'"
"Billy Bad Ass"
"Livin' for the Weekend"
"I Ain't to Be Fucked With"
"Check Ya Self"
"It's All Good"
"The Don't Knows"
"Ms. Thang"
"Back Stabbers"
"Dap Do"

Charts

References

1993 debut albums
Suga-T albums
Albums produced by Studio Ton
Sick Wid It Records albums